Sharyn Anne Hill (born 19 May 1954) is an Australian former cricketer who played as an all-rounder, batting right-handed and bowling right-arm medium. She appeared in three Test matches and 14 One Day Internationals for Australia between 1978 and 1982. Her final One Day International appearance was in the final of the 1982 Women's Cricket World Cup. She played domestic cricket for Victoria.

Her son, Michael, also played cricket, for Victoria amongst other teams.

References

External links
 
 
 Sharyn Hill at southernstars.org.au

Living people
1954 births
Cricketers from Melbourne
Australia women Test cricketers
Australia women One Day International cricketers
Victoria women cricketers